The Wichita Eagle is a daily newspaper published in Wichita, Kansas, United States. It is owned by The McClatchy Company and is the largest newspaper in Wichita and the surrounding area.

History

Origins
In 1870, The Vidette was the first newspaper established in Wichita by Fred A. Sowers and W. B. Hutchinson.  It operated briefly.

On April 12, 1872, The Wichita Eagle was founded and edited by Marshall M. Murdock, and it became a daily paper in May 1884.  His son, Victor Murdock, was a reporter for the paper during his teens, the managing editor from 1894 to 1903, an editor from the mid-1920s until his death in 1945.

In October 1872, The Wichita Daily Beacon was founded by Fred A. Sowers and David Millison.  It published daily for two months, then weekly until 1884 when it went back to daily.  In 1907, Henry Allen purchased the Beacon and was publisher for many years.

Mergers
The Eagle and Beacon competed for 88 years, then in 1960 the Eagle purchased the Beacon. Both newspapers continued to be published, the Eagle in the morning, the Beacon in the evening, the Eagle and Beacon on Sunday.

In 1973, the Murdock family sold the paper to Ridder Publications.  Ridder and Knight Newspapers merged in 1974 to form Knight Ridder, which combined the two newspapers into The Wichita Eagle-Beacon in 1980.

In 1989, the Beacon name was dropped, and the newspaper became The Wichita Eagle.

In 2006, the Eagle became part of The McClatchy Company when McClatchy bought Knight Ridder.

Internet
On November 18, 1996, the Eagle launched its first website, Wichita Online, at wichitaeagle.com.  On January 22, 2000, its domain was changed to kansas.com.

Move
In spring 2016, McClatchy Company announced that it would transfer printing of the Eagle from Wichita to its Kansas City Star printing line in Kansas City, Missouri, which already prints other newspapers such as Lawrence Journal-World and Topeka Capital-Journal.  The move eliminated 27 full-time and 47 part-time jobs.  The building will be sold and the editing staff will move to a smaller location in downtown Wichita.  In fall 2016, Cargill announced that it would move its "Protein Group" headquarters from downtown Wichita into a new $60 Million building on the site of the former Eagle building at 825 East Douglas Avenue in old town.

In January 2017, the paper announced it had signed a deal for office space in the Old Town area of downtown Wichita. It plans to move newsroom and advertising employees to 330 North Mead (from 825 East Douglas) in the spring of 2017.  The new site is located southeast of the Warren Old Town Theater.

Civic journalism
The paper built its national reputation largely under the editorship of W. Davis "Buzz" Merritt Jr., one of the earliest and most vocal proponents of civic journalism (also known as public journalism) which believes that journalists and their audiences are not merely spectators in political and social processes, and that journalists should not simply report dry facts as a pretense that their reporting represents unadulterated neutrality, which is impossible. (see Objectivity in Journalism) Instead, the civic journalism movement seeks to treat readers and community members as participants. With a small, but growing following, civic journalism has become as much of an ideology as it is a practice.

The Wichita Eagle was at the forefront of this movement. For example, for elections held in 1990, the paper polled 500 residents to identify their top concerns for the state. Then, over the course of the elections, reporters for the paper attempted to pin down the candidates on how they felt about these issues, and printed a pull-out section each week with a list of the issues and where the candidates stated they stood. If the candidate refused to take a stand, that was also reported. This is in stark contrast to the former practice of simply reporting the facts about a candidate's speech. As a result, voter turnout in the Eagle's primary circulation area was 43.3 percent, compared with 31 percent for the rest of the state.

See also
 List of newspapers in Kansas

References

 Michael Hoyt, (July, 1992) "The Wichita Experiment", (Columbia Journalism Review)
 The McClatchy Company, Newspaper Profiles: The Wichita Eagle, accessed October 17, 2006.

Further reading
 History of Wichita and Sedgwick County Kansas : Past and present, including an account of the cities, towns, and villages of the county (two volumes); O.H. Bentley; 454 and 479 pages; 1910. (Online Book Vol 1, Vol 2)
 Wichita: Illustrated History 1868 to 1880; Eunice S. Chapter; 52 pages; 1914. (Online Book)
 Wichita: The Early Years, 1865-80; H. Craig Miner; 201 page; 1982; . 
 Knightfall: Knight Ridder and How the Erosion of Newspaper Journalism is Putting Democracy at Risk; Davis Merritt; 242 pages; 2005; .

External links 

 

Knight Ridder
Newspapers published in Kansas
Publications established in 1872
Mass media in Wichita, Kansas
McClatchy publications
1872 establishments in Kansas